Valley Christian School is a private Christian school located in Missoula, Montana. Valley Christian is part of the Montana High School Association. Both girl and boy teams are named the Eagles. Valley Christian School is accredited with the Montana Office of Public Instruction.

History 
Valley Christian was founded in 1979 with approximately 25 students.

References 

Christian schools in Montana
Educational institutions established in 1979
High schools in Missoula, Montana
Nondenominational Christian schools in the United States
Private high schools in Montana
1979 establishments in Montana